Spangler–Benner Farm is a historic farm and national historic district located at Mount Joy Township in Adams County, Pennsylvania. The district includes nine contributing buildings and two contributing structures.  The contributing buildings are the sided log farmhouse (1870), frame bank barn (1864), log summer kitchen (1802), smoke house, spring house, wagon sheds, tools sheds, and machine shops. Contributing structures are a wooden silo and metal windmill, erected in 1900. The farm has been in continuous ownership by the same family since 1802.

It was listed on the National Register of Historic Places in 1992.

References

External links

  

Houses on the National Register of Historic Places in Pennsylvania
Historic districts on the National Register of Historic Places in Pennsylvania
Houses in Adams County, Pennsylvania
Houses completed in 1870
Infrastructure completed in 1864
Infrastructure completed in 1900
Historic American Buildings Survey in Pennsylvania
National Register of Historic Places in Adams County, Pennsylvania
Farms on the National Register of Historic Places in Pennsylvania